Lie detector is the popular term for a polygraph, a device that measures and records physiological indices, under the belief that these are useful for lie detection.

Lie Detector may also refer to:

 Silent Talker Lie Detector, an alternative to the polygraph, invented between 2000 and 2002
 Lie Detector (TV series), a 2005 show on PAX TV
 Lie Detectors, an American game show
 "Lie Detector" (song), a song by Reverend Horton Heat
 "Lie Detector", a song by the Dead Kennedys from Bedtime for Democracy 
 Lie Detector, a 1960 board game originally published by Mattel

See also
"Lie Detector Test," a song by Bis from The New Transistor Heroes